The Women is a 2009 novel by T. C. Boyle. It is a fictional account of Frank Lloyd Wright's life, told through his relationships with four women: the young Montenegrin dancer Olgivanna; Miriam, the "morphine-addicted and obsessive Southern belle"; Mamah, whose life ended in a massacre at Taliesin, the home Wright built for his lovers and wives; and his first wife, Kitty, the mother of six of his children."

Book information
The Women by T. C. Boyle
Hardcover -  (2009, First edition) published by Viking Press

References

External links
 T.C. Boyle official web site

2009 American novels

Novels by T. C. Boyle
Biographical novels
Novels about architects
Viking Press books
Cultural depictions of Frank Lloyd Wright